Philip W. Chung is a Korean American writer/producer, co-founder of Los Angeles-based Lodestone Theatre Ensemble and was its co-artistic director.

Career 
Chung has written and produced for theatre, film and television.  He was the Co-Founder/Artistic Director of the Asian American theatre company Lodestone Theatre Ensemble and is the current creative director for director Justin Lin's company YOMYOMF. His producing projects include the upcoming LGBTQ-themed horror film Moonshadow, the Stage 13/HBO Max Asian food series Family Style, and Google's first 360 degree live-action film Help  directed by Justin Lin.

Chung has taught Asian American studies courses at UC Santa Cruz and playwriting at the L.A. Cultural Affairs Dept. and the Asian American Writers Workshop.

His play My Man Kono about the life of Charlie Chaplin's Japanese American valet Toraichi Kono premieres off-Broadway in NYC in 2025.

Plays 
 Home is Where the Han Is
 Laughter, Joy & Loneliness & Sex & Sex & Sex & Sex
 Dead of Night
 Aziatik Nation '04
 The Golden Hour 
 One Nation, Under God 
 My Man Kono
 Grace Kim & The Spiders From Mars

References

External links

American dramatists and playwrights of Korean descent
American writers of Korean descent
Place of birth missing (living people)
Year of birth missing (living people)
Living people
American male journalists
University of California, Santa Cruz faculty